A chocolate bar (Commonwealth English) or candy bar (some dialects of American English) is a confection containing chocolate, which may also contain layerings or mixtures that include nuts, fruit, caramel, nougat, and wafers. A flat, easily breakable, chocolate bar is also called a tablet. In some varieties of English and food labeling standards, the term chocolate bar is reserved for bars of solid chocolate, with candy bar used for products with additional ingredients.

The manufacture of a chocolate bar from raw cocoa ingredients requires many steps, from grinding and refining, to conching and tempering. All these processes have been independently developed by chocolate manufacturers from different countries. There is therefore no precise moment when the first chocolate bar came into existence. Solid chocolate was already consumed in the 18th century. The 19th century saw the emergence of the modern chocolate industry; most manufacturing techniques used today were invented during this period.

Dark, milk and white are the main types of chocolate. Ingredients not derived from cocoa have been added to bars since the beginning of the chocolate industry, often to reduce production costs. A wide variety of chocolate bar brands are sold nowadays.

Terminology
In many varieties of English, chocolate bar refers to any confectionery bar that contains chocolate. In some dialects of American English, only bars of solid chocolate are described as chocolate bars, with the phrase candy bar used as a broader term encompassing bars of solid chocolate, bars combining chocolate with other ingredients, and bars containing no chocolate at all. In Canada, while the term chocolate bar is commonly used for bars combining chocolate with other ingredients, only bars of solid chocolate can be labelled as a chocolate bar.

The term bar may refer to a large variety of shapes, including not oblong ones, such as squares. Small (bite-sized) chocolate pieces are however usually referred to as chocolates, regardless of shape.

History

Early history

Solid chocolate was probably already consumed in pre-Columbian America, in particular by the Aztecs, despite the beverage being the traditional form of consumption of cocoa in Mesoamerica. Dominican friar Diego Durán mentions in his writings that Aztec soldiers carried ground cocoa balls among other military rations.

Until the 18th century, chocolate was essentially consumed as a drink. Transport of cocoa beans was slow and difficult, therefore making the product very expensive in Europe. Chocolate was usually sold as a solidified ground but still grainy cocoa paste (in the form of blocks, sticks or balls) to be dissolved in water or milk, either raw or already sweetened and flavoured. It is unclear when bars or tablets of chocolate (meant to be eaten raw rather than grated into a drink) were made for the first time. It is known, however, that the consumption of solid chocolate by the wealthy increased by the end of the 18th century.

Up to and including the 19th century, confectionery of all sorts was typically sold in small pieces to be bagged and bought by weight.  The introduction of chocolate as something that could be eaten as is, rather than used to make beverages or desserts, resulted in the earliest bar forms, or tablets. At some point, chocolates came to mean any chocolate-covered sweets, whether nuts, creams (fondant), caramel candies, or others. The chocolate bar evolved from all of these in the late-19th century as a way of packaging and selling candy more conveniently for both buyer and seller; however, the buyer had to pay for the packaging. It was considerably cheaper to buy candy loose, or in bulk.

The production of chocolate specifically meant to be eaten in bars may predate the French Revolution. The Marquis de Sade wrote to his wife in a letter dated May 16, 1779, complaining about the quality of a care package he had received while in prison. Among the requests that he made for future deliveries were for cookies that "must smell of chocolate, as if one were biting into a chocolate bar." This phrasing is highly suggestive of chocolate bars being eaten by themselves and not just grated into chocolate-based drinks, as was a far more common use at this time. Such a product would predate the invention of the cocoa press and the "Dutch cocoa" by Coenraad Johannes van Houten and other innovations which made chocolate suitable for mass-production.

First mass-produced chocolate bars
In 1819, Swiss grocer and chocolatier François-Louis Cailler founded Cailler and opened a sophisticated and water-powered chocolate factory, which allowed him to produce solid chocolate that was molded into tablets. After a few years, sixteen different sorts of chocolate with different packagings were proposed. Shortly after, in 1826, another Swiss chocolatier, Philippe Suchard, opened a chocolate factory where he developed a millstone machine to mix sugar and cocoa: the melanger. Before opening his factory, Suchard realized that a small tablet sold at a pharmacy was worth three days' wages.

In 1836, French pharmacist Antoine Brutus Menier launched a chocolate tablet with six semi-cylindrical divisions. He previously used chocolate as a coating for pills.

Earlier, in 1828, Casparus van Houten patented an inexpensive method for pressing the fat from roasted cocoa beans. The center of the bean, known as the "nib", contains an average of 54 percent cocoa butter. Van Houten's machine – a hydraulic press – reduced the cocoa butter content by nearly half. This not only allowed the creation of defatted cocoa powder (to be used for chocolate drinks), but also the creation of pure cocoa butter.

In 1847, Joseph Fry discovered a way to mix the ingredients of cocoa powder, sugar and cocoa to manufacture a paste with a higher percentage of cocoa butter that could then be more easily molded into a solid chocolate bar. He is generally credited for the first mass-produced bar. Inspired by Fry, John Cadbury, founder of Cadbury, introduced his brand of the chocolate bar in 1849. That same year, Fry and Cadbury chocolate bars were displayed publicly at a trade fair in Bingley Hall, Birmingham.

Fry's chocolate factory, J. S. Fry & Sons of Bristol, England, began mass-producing chocolate bars and they became very popular.  Over 220 Fry's products were introduced in the following decades. Fry's Cream Sticks, released in 1853, were the first filled chocolate candy, and led to the Fry's Chocolate Cream bar in 1866. Other products included the first chocolate Easter egg in the UK in 1873, and Fry's Turkish Delight (or Fry's Turkish bar) in 1914.

In addition to Cadbury and Fry, Rowntree's and Terry's were major British chocolate companies, as chocolate manufacturing expanded in England throughout the rest of the century.

Modern chocolate bars

Rodolphe Lindt, a Swiss confectioner, discovered the conching process in 1879. Conching evenly blends cocoa butter with cocoa solids and sugar, therefore making the chocolate smoother. The last stage of chocolate manufacturing, tempering, was also developed at around this time. Tempering allows the production of chocolate that is perfectly hard at room temperature and that have an attractive shiny appearance.

A few years earlier, in 1875, milk chocolate makes its appearance. It was developed by another Swiss confectioner, Daniel Peter. He was able to make milk chocolate with the help of his neighbour Henri Nestlé, who was specialized in dehydrated milk products. Daniel Peter launched his successful Gala Peter brand in 1887. Cailler and Suchard followed in the late 19th century, and other factories opened in Switzerland at that time.

In 1897, following the lead of Swiss companies, Cadbury introduced its own line of milk chocolate bars in the UK. Cadbury Dairy Milk, first produced in 1905, became the company's best selling bar.

In the United States, immigrants who arrived with candy-making skills drove the development of new chocolate bars. Milton S. Hershey, a Pennsylvania caramel maker, saw a German-manufactured chocolate-making machine at the 1893 Chicago World's Fair. He immediately ordered one for his Lancaster factory and produced the first American-made milk chocolate bar.

In Canada, Ganong Bros., Ltd. of St. Stephen, New Brunswick developed and began selling their version of the modern chocolate bar in 1910.

Chocolate bar sales grew rapidly in the early-20th century. During World War I, the U.S. Army commissioned a number of American chocolate makers to produce 40 pound blocks of chocolate. These were shipped to Army quartermaster bases and distributed to the troops stationed throughout Europe. When the soldiers returned home, their demand for chocolate contributed to the increasing popularity of the chocolate bar.

Combination bars

The first chocolate bars were plain chocolate, but often flavoured with spices, such as cinnamon and vanilla. Producers soon began combining chocolate with other ingredients such as nuts, fruit, caramel, nougat, and wafers. In 1830, Kohler added hazelnuts to chocolate bars and, in 1852, Caffarel added hazelnuts as a smooth paste to its chocolate, creating gianduja. Adding other, usually cheaper, ingredients to bars was also a way to reduce production costs. Approximately 30,000 varieties of candy bars existed in the United States during the 1920s, most of which were produced locally. The overwhelming majority of combination bars use milk chocolate.

A wide selection of similar chocolate snacks or nutritional supplements are produced with added sources of protein and vitamins, including energy bars, protein bars and granola bars.

The Fry's Chocolate Cream, produced by J. S. Fry & Sons since 1866, consisted of a plain fondant centre enrobed in dark chocolate
The Branche, created by Kohler and produced by Cailler since 1904, is a cylindrical and branch-looking milk chocolate and hazelnut bar with a praline filling, partly made with recycled broken confectionery. As a consequence of its wide success, "branche" has become a generic term (in French) for any stick-like chocolate bar.
The Goo Goo Cluster, produced by the Standard Candy Company of Nashville, Tennessee, in 1912, was the first combination bar in the United States. It was made of caramel, marshmallow, and peanuts, covered with milk chocolate. 
The Clark Bar, a crispy core with caramel and peanut butter covered with milk chocolate, was the first nationally marketed combination bar in the United States.
The Oh Henry! bar was created by George Williamson of Williamson Candy Co. and named after an electrician who visited his store and flirted with the female candy makers. Williamson launched an advertising campaign that included newspaper ads, streetcar signs, and billboards. The Oh Henry! bar became one of the top-selling brands in the United States in the 1920s. In 1926, the company published a book, 60 New Ways to Serve a Famous Candy, that included recipes for salads, side dishes, and sweet breads, in addition to desserts.
The Baby Ruth was developed by Otto Schnering, owner of the Curtiss Candy Co., by modifying their original candy bar, Kandy Kake, to compete with the Oh Henry! bar. Schnering claimed that the Baby Ruth was named in honor of President Grover Cleveland's daughter, who died at age 12, but some historians suggest that Schnering chose the name to take advantage of the popularity of Babe Ruth without having to pay royalties. Schnering decided to sell his bar for half the price of its competitor, hiring legendary Chicago ad man, Eddy S. Brandt, to market the Baby Ruth under the slogan "Everything you want for a nickel." The catchy slogan, along with other innovative marketing tactics, like sponsoring circuses and dropping Baby Ruth bars over cities from airplanes, made Baby Ruth the most popular candy bar in the U.S by 1925.
 Mars bars were introduced by Mars, Incorporated in 1932 in Slough, England, by Forrest Mars, Sr., consisting of caramel and nougat coated with milk chocolate.

Ingredients

A solid chocolate bar contains some or all of the following components: cocoa solids, cocoa butter, sugar, and milk. The relative presence or absence of these define the subclasses of chocolate bar made of dark chocolate, milk chocolate, and white chocolate. In addition to these main ingredients a solid chocolate bar may contain flavorings such as vanilla and emulsifiers such as soy lecithin to alter its consistency. Some chocolate bars contain added milk fat, to make the chocolate softer, since milk fat is a softer fat than cocoa butter. While sugar is commonly used as a sweetener for chocolate bars, some chocolate bars use sugar alcohols such as maltitol as an alternative.  Compound chocolate, which uses vegetable oils in place of cocoa butter, may be used as a less expensive alternative to true chocolate, though such a product may not be able to be labelled as "chocolate". Combination bars may contain a wide variety of additional ingredients.

Popular culture

Literature and film
The Wonka Bar was introduced as a fictional chocolate  bar that served as a key story point in the 1964 novel Charlie and the Chocolate Factory by Roald Dahl.  Wonka Bars appear in both film adaptations of the novel, Willy Wonka & the Chocolate Factory (1971) and Charlie and the Chocolate Factory (2005). Wonka Bars were subsequently manufactured and sold in the real world, formerly by the Willy Wonka Candy Company, a division of Nestlé.

Records

World's largest 
The world's largest chocolate bar was produced as a stunt by Thorntons plc (UK) on 7 October 2011.

On January 16, 2020, Mars Inc. received the Guinness World Record for largest chocolate nut bar. They produced a 12-foot by 27.5-inch by 27.5-inch Snickers that weighed 4,728 lbs which is the equivalent of 41,000 single-size Snickers.

On January 31, 2020, the Hershey Company beat the Guinness World Record for largest chocolate nut bar surpassing Mars Inc.'s Gigantic Snickers bar with a gigantic Reese's Take 5 Bar measuring 9 by 5.5 by 2 feet and weighing 5,943 lbs. The Take 5 chocolate bar gets its name from the 5 ingredients it contains: Reese's peanut butter, peanuts, pretzels, caramel and chocolate.

Oldest extant
Some of the oldest preserved chocolate bars are two pieces of white and dark chocolate made between 1764 and 1795 for the king of Poland, Stanislaus Augustus Poniatowski, as a gift for his courtiers. Each bar, possibly made by the royal confectioner in Warsaw, bears the King's monogram, SAR, and is on display in his summer residence, Palace on the Water, in Warsaw.

See also

 Energy bar
 Granola bar
 List of chocolate bar brands
 List of chocolate-covered foods
 United States military chocolate

References

Further reading

 Almond, Steve (2004) Candyfreak, Algonquin Books of Chapel Hill, 
 Broekel, Ray (1982) The Great American Candy Bar Book, Houghton Mifflin Co., 
 Cadbury, Deborah (2011) Chocolate Wars: The 150-Year Rivalry Between the World's Greatest Chocolate Makers, PublicAffairs
 Richardson, Tim (2002) Sweets: A History of Candy, Bloomsbury,

External links

"History of Candy Bar Wrappers", Grager, Dave (2004)

British inventions
 
Snack foods
Convenience foods
Chocolate confectionery
Chocolate-covered foods
Chocolate desserts